Efe İnanç (born March 24, 1980 in Üsküdar) is a Turkish footballer who last played for Kocaeli Birlik Spor as attacking midfield position.

References

External links
profil 

1980 births
Fenerbahçe S.K. footballers
Living people
Turkish footballers
İstanbul Başakşehir F.K. players
Süper Lig players
People from Üsküdar
Footballers from Istanbul
TFF First League players

Association football midfielders